Astra Clément-Bayard was a French manufacturer of dirigibles.

In 1908 the French industrialist Adolphe Clément-Bayard, who had already made a fortune manufacturing cars, motorcycles and bicycles, diversified into the aviation industry.  His first project was a lens-shaped airship designed by Louis Capazza, which was never built. He then collaborated with the Société Astra (Société Astra des Constructions Aéronautiques) on the manufacture of a more conventional craft.  Astra were responsible for the manufacture of the envelope, and Clement-Bayard took responsibility for the nacelle and engine.  After this collaborative effort the company started manufacturing the envelopes as well, at a new factory in La Motte-Breuil built in anticipation of orders from  the French Army, who had  decided to commence airship operations.

The Clément-Bayard No.1 airship was offered to the French government but was too expensive so it was bought by Tsar Nicholas II for the Russian army.

The army ordered three.

The company was bought by Citroën in 1922.

The airship hangar in La Motte-Breuil is still maintained by Clément-Talbot Ltd.

Clément-Bayard dirigibles 
Seven Clément-Bayard airships were completed.

First flew on 28 October 1908.
Top speed 54 km/h. First flew on 1 June 1910.
First flew on 1 May 1912.
Top speed 49 km/h. First flew in 1911.
Top speed 53 km/h. First flew on 13 August 1913.
First flew on 9 February 1913.
 Montgolfier, long, 12.2 metres wide,  capacity, powered by 2 Clément-Bayard 90 hp engines. Top speed 60 km/h. First flew on 31 July 1913.

See also
 Société Astra (Société Astra des Constructions Aéronautiques)

References

Defunct aircraft manufacturers of France
Manufacturing companies established in 1908
Brass Era vehicles
Airships
French companies established in 1908
Manufacturing companies disestablished in 1922
1922 disestablishments in France